KCFI (1250 AM) is a commercial radio station licensed to serve the Cedar Falls, Iowa area. The station primarily broadcasts an oldies format but airs Minnesota Twins baseball and some sports overflow from sister station KCNZ. KCFI is licensed to James Coloff's Coloff Media, LLC. It was first licensed on July 13, 1960.

During daylight hours, KCFI uses two towers in a directional array that concentrates the broadcast signal southeast toward Cedar Rapids, Iowa. At night, three towers are used to create a three lobe pattern that slightly favors the south and west.

History

KCFI was initially licensed to Jane A. Roberts, for 500 watts, daytime-only, on 1250 kHz in Cedar Falls, Iowa. On June 16, 1995, the station's call letters were changed to KCNZ.

Expanded Band assignment

On March 17, 1997, the Federal Communications Commission (FCC) announced that eighty-eight stations had been given permission to move to newly available "Expanded Band" transmitting frequencies, ranging from 1610 to 1700 kHz, with KCNZ authorized to move from 1250 to 1650 kHz.

A Construction Permit for the new station on 1650 kHz, also located in Cedar Falls, was issued the call sign KDNZ on August 3, 1998. The FCC's initial policy was that both the original station and its expanded band counterpart could operate simultaneously for up to five years, after which owners would have to turn in one of the two licenses, depending on whether they preferred the new assignment or elected to remain on the original frequency. However, this deadline has been extended multiple times, and both stations have remained authorized. One restriction is that the FCC has generally required paired original and expanded band stations to remain under common ownership.

Later history

On March 31, 2004, the two stations swapped call letters, with KCNZ moving from 1250 AM to 1650 AM, and KDNZ transferred to 1250 AM from 1650 AM. On May 24, 2012, 1250 AM went back to its original call sign of KCFI.

References

External links

FCC History Cards for KCFI (covering 1956–1981)

CFI
Cedar Falls, Iowa